Rebel Yellow is a studio album by Cecil Otter, a founding member of Minneapolis indie hip hop collective Doomtree. Originally released on Doomtree Records in 2008, it was re-released on Strange Famous Records in 2009. Vita.mn placed the album at 8th on its list of the Best Local Albums of the 2000s.

Music
Rebel Yellow is entirely produced by Cecil Otter, with contributions from Kareel. The album included one feature total from fellow Doomtree member P.O.S.

Track listing

Personnel
Credits adapted from liner notes.
 Cecil Otter – vocals, production
 Kareel – production (on 2, 3 and 7)
 James Lynch – electric bass (on 4)
 Sean McPherson – electric bass (on 8)
 Nate Collins – vocals (on 9), guitar (on 9)
 P.O.S – vocals (on 11)
 Dave Brockschmidt – guitar (on 13)
 Corey Stein – executive production
 Joe Mabbott – engineering
 Taylor Dees – painting
 Abe Coleman – lettering
 MK Larada – layout, photography

References

External links
 
 Rebel Yellow at Bandcamp

2008 albums
Cecil Otter albums
Doomtree Records albums
Strange Famous Records albums